Poljot (literally meaning "flight"), is a brand of Soviet/Russian wristwatches, produced since 1964 by the First Moscow Watch Factory (Perviy Moskovskiy Chasovoy Zavod). The flagship brand of the USSR's watch industry, Poljot produced numerous historical watches used in many important space missions, including the world's first space watch worn by Yuri Gagarin.

History

Founded in 1930 under orders from Joseph Stalin, the First State Watch Factory was the first large scale Soviet watch and mechanical movement manufacturer. Via its USA-based trading company Amtorg, the Soviet government bought the defunct Ansonia Clock Company of Brooklyn, New York in 1929, and the Dueber-Hampden Watch Company of Canton, Ohio. As part of the Soviet's first five-year plan, twenty-eight freight cars worth of machinery and parts were moved from the USA to Moscow in order to establish the factory; further, twenty-one former Dueber-Hampden technicians trained Russian workers in the art of watchmaking. The movements of very-early products were still stamped "Dueber-Hampden, Canton, Ohio, USA" (examples of these watches are highly collectible today). In 1935, the factory was named after the assassinated Soviet official Sergei Kirov.

As the Germans advanced on Moscow in 1941, the factory was evacuated to Zlatoust. By 1943, the tide of the war was turned and the Germans were in retreat, and subsequently, the factory moved back to Moscow. At this point, it adopted the "First Moscow Watch Factory" name.

In 1947 the first wristwatches under the brand name "Pobeda" and the first marine chronometers and hack watches or deck watches were produced. By 1951 the production of wristwatches had increased to 1.1 million. In 1975 new machinery and equipment for manufacturing complex watches was imported from Switzerland.

PMChZ watches in Space

Gagarin's flight
On 12 April 1961 Yuri Gagarin became the first man in space. The watch Gagarin wore was made by the First Moscow Watch Company under the name Sturmanskie, which translates to "Navigator's". Today's owner of the brand, Volmax (based in both Moscow and Switzerland), is the only authorized company allowed to use Gagarin's name and likeness in watch production. Gagarin received his 17-jewel watch with a manual-wind Poljot movement when he graduated from the Soviet air force flight school in 1957. The original watches were built exclusively for the Soviet Air Force and not available to the public. Publicly available versions of the model were not released until years later. With a diameter of 33 mm, the original watch was small by today's standards. The watch performed flawlessly in space and is currently on display at the Moscow Memorial Museum of Cosmonautics. Commemorative editions produced today are 40 mm and have a 17-jewel Poljot movement.

First space walk
In 1965 cosmonaut Alexei Leonov wore an FMWF Strela (transliteration of СТРЕЛА, which means "Arrow") chronograph during his first space walk.

Current status

In late 2003, rumors predicting the formal shuttering of the Poljot brand circulated on the Internet. According to the rumors, the First Moscow Watch Factory was to cease producing their own models and become a source of inexpensive movements for other European watch brands. These rumours never came to fruition. Instead, in the late 2000s, the company was bought by the businessman Sergeï Pugachev, becoming one of the companies of his new luxury group, including: Hédiard, and the channel Luxe TV. The physical remnants of First Moscow Watch Factory were purchased by a group of former Poljot employees, forming the basis for a new company, Volmax. Volmax marketed watches under the Aviator, Buran and Shturmanskie brands using movements produced by another Russian firm, MakTime.

As of 2012, the status of the Poljot brand is unclear, though the brand appears to be moribund. MakTime, the company utilizing old Poljot equipment to manufacture mechanical movements, went bankrupt, and Volmax, the successor company to First Moscow Watch Factory relocated to Switzerland. Present models from the Volmax company are Swiss-made, using design cues from vintage Russian models.

See also

 Raketa
  Pobeda
 Vostok

Notes

External links

Documentary: "The History of a Russian Watch Factory" 
Web story by Alan Garratt: "The Birth of Soviet Watchmaking" (in English)

Companies based in Moscow
Manufacturing companies established in 1930
Watch manufacturing companies of Russia
Russian brands
Design companies established in 1930
1930 establishments in Russia
Soviet watch brands
Watch manufacturing companies of the Soviet Union